Leslie or Les Pearce may refer to:

 Leslie Pearce (director) (1887–1977), New Zealand film director
 Les Pearce (general) (1918–2002), senior commander in the New Zealand Army and rugby union official
 Les Pearce (Welsh rugby) (1923–2018), Welsh rugby union and rugby league player and coach